UFC Fight Night: Machida vs. Muñoz (also known as UFC Fight Night 30) was a mixed martial arts event held on October 26, 2013, at the Phones 4u Arena in Manchester, United Kingdom.

Background
The main card of the event was broadcast on Fox Sports 2.

The event was expected to be headlined by a middleweight bout between top contenders Michael Bisping and Mark Muñoz. However, on September 27 Bisping pulled out of the bout with an eye injury and was replaced by Lyoto Machida.

Tom Watson was expected to face Alessio Sakara at this event. However, Watson had to pull out due to an injury and was replaced by Magnus Cedenblad.  Subsequently, in early October, Cedenblad was forced out of the Sakara bout with an injury and replaced by newcomer Nico Musoke.

Paul Taylor was expected to face Anthony Njokuani at this event. However, Taylor was forced to pull out due to an injury and was replaced by Al Iaquinta.  On September 24, Njokuani also pulled out of the event with an injury.  Iaquinta eventually faced Piotr Hallmann.

Mike Wilkinson was expected to face Jimy Hettes at the event.  However, Wilkinson pulled out of the bout in the week leading up the bout and was replaced by newcomer Rob Whiteford.

John Lineker weighed in two pounds too heavy and forfeited a part of his purse.

Results

Bonus awards
The following fighters were awarded $50,000 bonuses.
 Fight of the Night: Luke Barnatt vs. Andrew Craig
 Knockout of the Night: Lyoto Machida
 Submission of the Night: Nicholas Musoke

See also
List of UFC events
2013 in UFC

References

UFC Fight Night
2013 in mixed martial arts
Mixed martial arts in the United Kingdom
Sports competitions in Manchester
2013 in English sport
October 2013 sports events in the United Kingdom